Serjical Strike Records is an American record label, owned by Universal Music Group, and operates under Republic Records.

Background
Serjical Strike was founded in April 2001 by Serj Tankian (lead singer of System of a Down), and has cast away the restrictions of large scale record labels to create a 'unique and imaginative' label that provides a large spectrum of musical talent. In the previous five years Serj and the team have signed various bands of differing styles; Bad Acid Trip, Kittens for Christian, Slow Motion Reign, and Fair to Midland, and at the same time a good relationship with Columbia records has been built up. Serj also worked with Arto Tuncboyaciyan on a collaboration album named Serart out of Serjical Strike. The live album/DVD Axis of Justice: Concert Series Volume 1 and the Buckethead & Friends' 2005 release Enter the Chicken were under the Serjical Strike label. Serj Tankian's debut solo album Elect the Dead was also on Serjical Strike Records in addition to Reprise Records. In August 2007 Serjical Strike started its own YouTube account.

Artists

Current artists
 Arto Tunçboyacıyan
 Axis of Justice
 Bad Acid Trip
 Buckethead
 The Cause
 Flying Cunts of Chaos
 Khatchadour Tankian
 Kittens for Christian
 Serart
 Serj Tankian (solo music)
 Slow Motion Reign
 Viza

Former artists

 Mt. Helium
 Armenian Navy Band
 Death by Stereo
 Fair to Midland
 Ontronik Khachaturian

Releases

Other albums available on the Serjical Strike website
 Bigelf — Money Machine

See also
List of record labels

References

External links

Serjical Strike Records at MySpace

Record labels established in 2001
American record labels
Vanity record labels
Serj Tankian